Srikanth Sastry is an Indian physicist. He is a Boston University alumnus and he along with Raghunathan Srianand were awarded the Shanti Swarup Bhatnagar Prize for Science and Technology in physical sciences in 2008.

Sastry received his PhD from Boston University in 1993. Since then he has held roles as a postdoctoral researcher at the National Institutes of Health and at Princeton University. In 1998 he became faculty fellow at Jawaharlal Nehru Centre for Advanced Scientific Research and since 2003 he has held a position as associate professor at Jawaharlal Nehru Centre for Advanced Scientific Research. He is currently a professor at the Theoretical Science Unit, Jawaharlal Nehru Centre for Advanced Scientific Research, Jakkur campus, Bangalore.

Sastry's research interests are:
 Slow dynamics in super cooled liquids and glass transition
 Metastable liquids
 Phase transitions and kinetics of phase transformation
 Statistical geometry
 Anomalous thermodynamic and dynamic properties of water and other network forming liquids
 Statistical mechanics of biomolecular systems.

Recognition
Sastry is the recipient of
 Swarnajayanthi Fellowship:
 Shanti Swarup Bhatnagar Awards 2008:
 Fellow of the American Physical Society, 2022

References

External links
 http://www.jncasr.ac.in/sastry

Boston University alumni
Living people
Scientists from Bangalore
20th-century Indian physicists
Thermodynamicists
Year of birth missing (living people)
Fellows of the American Physical Society